Midnight is a 1931 British comedy crime film directed by George King and starring Eve Gray, George Bellamy and Ellen Pollock. It was a quota quickie made at Nettlefold Studios for distribution by the British subsidiary of the American Fox Film Company.

Cast
 Eve Gray as Dorothy Harding  
 George Bellamy as Max Strubel 
 Ellen Pollock as Sonia Strubel  
 Kiyoshi Takase as Ching

References

Bibliography
 Low, Rachael. Filmmaking in 1930s Britain. George Allen & Unwin, 1985.
 Wood, Linda. British Films, 1927-1939. British Film Institute, 1986.

External links
 

1931 films
Films directed by George King
1930s crime comedy films
British crime comedy films
Films shot at Nettlefold Studios
Fox Film films
British black-and-white films
1931 comedy films
1930s English-language films
1930s American films
1930s British films